Sierra Sur  is a region in the state of Oaxaca, Mexico. It includes the districts of Putla, Sola de Vega, Miahuatlán and Yautepec.  Miahuatlán de Porfirio Díaz is the largest city.
The region has 70 municipalities, some very poor, such as Zanizá, Amoltepec and Los Loxichas.

Geography

The region is mountainous, along the southern edge of the Sierra Madre del Sur, and includes Quiexoba, the second highest mountain in the state. Forest resources are still important, despite having suffered over-exploitation for decades, and include pines, mixed forests of oak and pine, fir, and areas of hormiguillo cacti. 
Fauna include opossums, armadillos, deer, rabbit and gopher.

The climate is varied, ranging from hot and humid to temperate humid. The average temperature is 10°C to 22°C throughout the region. Average rainfall ranges from 800 to 2000mm annually.

Economy

Forestry is the main economic activity, with each community managing their forests and selling the logs to private mills. 
Agricultural production includes maize and beans, sugarcane and coffee. Livestock farming mostly consists of backyard breeding of  chickens, goats, pigs and mules. Small factories produce castor oil and process mica. The region has deposits of iron and magnetite. Craft products include spirits and mezcal, palm products and cotton goods.

Cultural Groups

The region's inhabitants are Zapotec, Mixtec, Chatinos, Amuzgo, Triques and mestizos, as well as emigrants from other parts of Mexico. 
Since pre-Hispanic times, there has been conflict between rival ethnic groups.

References

 
Regions of Oaxaca